USS LST-25 was a United States Navy  used in the European Theater of Operations and Asiatic-Pacific Theater during World War II.

Construction and commissioning
LST-25 was laid down on 12 October 1942 at Wilmington, Delaware, by the Dravo Corporation. She was launched on 9 March 1943, sponsored by Miss Dolly Hemphill, and commissioned on 3 May 1943.

Service history

1943 convoys
She was first assigned to the Europe-Africa-Middle East Theater. During her transit of the Atlantic, LST-25 was manned by the United States Coast Guard. It is not clear when LST-25 crossed the Atlantic but there are records of some of the convoys that she participated in. She sailed with Convoy KMS 23, in August 1943, during part of its journey from Gibraltar, to Port Said, Egypt, sailing from Oran, Algeria, to Bizerta, Tunisia. She was handed over to a US Navy crew in Bizerte, Tunisia, on 23 August 1943. LST-25 sailed from Algiers, Algeria, to Port Said, Egypt, in October 1943, this time joining with Convoy UGS 19.

She left Bombay, India, 11 November 1943, for Colombo, British Ceylon, arriving on 16 November. At the end of December she left Calcutta, with 11 LSTs headed for Colombo, British Ceylon, arriving 27 December 1943.

LST-25 joined Convoy MKS 38 at Bizerta, Tunisia, in January 1944, as it was en route to Gibraltar, arriving 1 February. Forming Convoy MKS 38G she rendezvoused with Convoy SL 147 and sailed for Liverpool on 2 February, arriving on 13 February 1944.

Normandy invasion

LST-25 took part in the Normandy landings during June 1944.

1945 convoys
LST-25 left from New York City, on 17 January 1945, as part of Convoy NG 484 bound for Guantanamo, Cuba, where she arrived on 23 January. She then left the next day as part of Convoy GZ 117 en route to the Panama Canal Zone and Cristóbal, Colón, where she arrived on 27 January.

Okinawa Gunto operation

LST-25 was then transferred to the Asiatic-Pacific Theater where she participated with the assault and occupation of Okinawa Gunto during May 1945.
 
Following the war, LST-25 performed occupation duty in the Far East from September 1945 through March 1946. She was decommissioned on 2 August 1946, and was struck from the Navy list on 8 October 1946. On 31 March 1948, she was sold to the Kaiser Co., Inc., Seattle, Washington, for scrapping.

Honors and awards
LST-25 earned two battle stars for her World War II service.

References

Bibliography

External links

LST-1-class tank landing ships of the United States Navy
World War II amphibious warfare vessels of the United States
Ships built in Wilmington, Delaware
1943 ships
Ships built by Dravo Corporation